Max-Him was an Italo disco project fronted by Florian Fadinger (May 6, 1960 – January 16, 2013), the former manager of German DJ/producer Sven Väth. All of the singing on Max-Him's albums was allegedly done by Italian musician Romano Trevisani, whilst Fadinger was the public image.

In 1985, Max-Him reached the No. 21 position in Germany with the song "Lady Fantasy".

Fadinger died on January 16, 2013, in Munich, Germany from unknown causes. He left behind a wife and six children. His body was cremated on January 24, 2013; He was buried the same day.

Discography

Albums 
 Danger Danger (1986)

Singles 
 "Roadhouse Blues" (1983)
 "No Escape" (1984)
 "Lady Fantasy" (1985) — GER No. 21
 "Japanese Girl" (1985) — GER No. 45
 "Melanie" (1986)
 "Danger, Danger" (1986)
 "Just a Love Affair" (1987)
 "Lady Fantasy 2003" (2003)

References

External links 
 

Italo disco groups
German pop music groups